Ulpur is a village to the north of Golpalganj in Bangladesh. It was founded by the Basu Roy Chowdhury of Ulpur family as seat of their Zamindari and Jagir called Shahpur.

Shahpur Pargana consisted of 27  (village plus surrounding greens, farmlands, lakes, etc.) and a population of 30,200 in 1931 with Ulpur being the central village and seat of the Zamindari.

Shahpur pargana was the name of the area in Moghul times. Ulpur acted as a kind of capital as that was where the Roy Chowdhurys who were the Zamindars and Mansabdars/Jagirdars of Shahpur lived. The name no longer exists in administrative records as administrative divisions were changed in British times. Now it is part of Gopalganj district (the British had made Gopalganj a sub-division headquarters within Barisal district. The Bangladeshi government has turned Gopalganj into a separate district).

History 
Dasarath Basu arrived in the 11th century in Bengal's Rarh region of present day West Bengal. One of his descendants, Raghunandan Basu, was reconfirmed the Zamindari/Jagir of Ulpur/Shahpur by the Moghuls (Jahangir) in the 16th century, where his descendants settled.
Many members of the Basu Roy Chowdhury clan of Ulpur left their ancestral home in East Bengal (now Bangladesh) after India was divided in 1947. However a few have remained behind and continue to participate in the social, political and cultural life of the area.

Bengali historians believe that the Adisur legend refers to Hemanta Sena, one of the Sena rulers who raided up to Kannauj. Bengali historian Dr Niharranjan Ray, in his book history of Bengal (Banglar itihas), says all the Sena rulers of Bengal also adopted a derivative of the title Sur. Adisur is probably one of the titles taken by Hemanta Sen, the Sena king of Bengal and grandfather of Ballal Sen who started the Kulin system in Bengal (the Basu Roy Chowdhurys are one of these Kulins). This system of dual titles was common among Indian kings. Emperor Ashoka, the famous Buddhist emperor whose embassies converted most of Asia to Buddhism, was also known as Devanampiya. For many decades, historians used to puzzle over stone edicts and pillars built by this Devanampiya. Much later an inscription was discovered showing the two to be one person, which cleared up this controversy. After Bengal was invaded by Muslim invaders in the 13th century, gentlemen from the court of the Hindu Sen rulers of Bengal fled eastwards and northwards to set up small principalities or to shelter in them. One such principality was Chandradvipa, in south eastern Bengal (now in Bangladesh) set up by the Deb family. The Basus intermarried with the Debs and settled down in this town. As did another family—the Guhas. Eventually Debs ran out of male progenies, and a Basu who was the son in law of the then ruling Deb prince, became the ruler.

The Guha family meanwhile was unsatisfied with the rule of these new Basu rulers and left to set up their own principality to the west of Chandradvipa, in Jessore. The Guha ruler of Jessore married into the Basu family and also married off his own sister to a Basu. The son of this marriage between a princess of Jessore and a Basu nobleman was Gopal Basu Thakur. The son born from the marriage of the Basu princess and the ruler of Jessore was Raja Pratapaditya Roy.

Pratapaditya is famous in Bengal's history as the 16th century leader of 12 Bhuias or Rajas who revolted against Mogul Emperor Akbar. There are many popular legends about him. Rabindra Nath Tagore, India's noble laureate poet wrote a drama based on an incident in his life. Gopal was his first cousin and close confidante and was with him until Pratapaditya met his death/capture (history is unclear on this count) at the hands of the Moguls.

But unlike Pratapaditya, Gopal was a philosopher. He went to Benaras (Varanasi), to study Hindu theology and philosophy. The Thakur title is an academic one bestowed upon him by the pandits of Benaras through a process of academic election.

The family choose to retain it in his honour and this was allowed by the Pandit  (academic council) of Benaras.

Gopal Basu Thakur went into hiding after the fall of Pratapaditya with his family and followers and was sheltered by local chiefs and barons sympathetic to his cause. Because of the bloodlines we represent, my family enjoyed a high social recognition in Bengal even as late as early 20th century.

Pratapaditya was defeated in battle by Emperor Akbar's father-in-law, the ruler of Jaipur -- Maharaja Man Singh—who had come at the head of a large Mogul imperial army for this purpose. Legend has it that the statuette of goddess Kali kept in the Jaipur royal fort is none other than that which Pratapaditya had in his palace temple. However, Jaipur historical accounts while admitting it comes from Bengal says it was found by the seashore.

Gopal Basu’s maternal line was Guhas of Jessore, his son's maternal line was Zamindars of Itna. Two families seemed to have been favoured in marital relations – descendants of their cousins the Guhas and the Sens of Berhampore (maybe because they were a cadet line of the original Sena kings of Bengal). Besides Guha Roy Chowdhurys and Sens, the family had strong matrimonial relations with the following Zamindar families: Ghosh Dastidars of Gabha, Guhas of Banaripara, Roys of Itna, Roy Chowdhurys of Idilpur, Roy Chowdhury (Rajas) of Santosh.

Ulpur was founded by Gopal's descendant Raghunandan with its surrounding villages serving as his personal fiefdom. Raghunandan has been the first Jagirdar of the area. The land, by Mogul rules, should have passed on to his eldest son.

Title 
The title is passed on to all the sons. The title was kept as a name after the partition (1947 East Bengal became part of Pakistan and the family lost their estate) and the actual name Basu was dropped (Basu Roy Chowdhury of Ulpur). The family got another title, Thakur, which they stopped using once they lived in Ulpur (17th century).

Roy is a Hindu title, which noblemen and those of royal blood took or were given. Chowdhury is a Mogul title, which the Mogul emperors gave to our ancestors for being their Jagirdars.

Hence all the three elements – Thakur, Roy and Chowdhury are titles but given at different times, for different reasons.

Estates 
The estates of the different family members can still be found in Ulpur and are now used by the villagers as their homes. The smaller temples and ponds are in a decaying condition, but the main Kali temple is still in use and has been recently renovated.

The village was once the center of the district/pargana with markets and a very active cultural life.

Ulpur (Basu Roy Chowdhury) emigres

Most Basu Roy Chowdhurys as well as other emigres from Ulpur settled down in Calcutta, then the largest city in India. An Ulpur Sammelani exists in that city of 'exiles' from the village. In the 1950s, Ulpur emigres had also set up a Ulpur football club which participated in the Indian Football Association shield.

Besides Calcutta, Ulpur residents have settled in Delhi, and most cities in India. They have also settled down in the US, UK, Germany, Austria, Romania and other parts of the globe.

Ulpurians

 Sarbari Roy Chowdhury, born in 1933 in Ulpur, well-known Bengali sculptor
 Subrata Roy Chowdhury
Suvro Roy Choudhury

References

 Archaeological survey report of Greater Faridpur District (2017), by Md. Abul Hashem Miah, Nazimuddin Ahmad, Bangladesh. Dept. of Archaeology
 Parichay: Vangaja Kayastha-ganer Samajika Ithisa saha Daksina Fardipurer Bil-pradeser Vivarna (1937), by Roy Chowdhury, Dinabandhu Calcutta
 Marriage and Rank in Bengali Culture, A history of caste and clan in Middle-Period Bengal, Ronald B. Inden (1976), University of California Press, Berkeley

External links
  Indian princely states website
  Fotos of Ulpur
  Basu Roy Chowdhury of Ulpur webpage
  article on Sarbari Roy Chowdhury

Populated places in Dhaka Division
Indian feudalism